The Bridle Track is an historic walking and horse trail between  and , located in the Bathurst Region local government area , in the Central West region of New South Wales, Australia. The trail is likely to have been established in s. The name of the trail is derived from the word bridle, referring to the horse livery and the track generally distinguished it from a road or carriageway; a common term used from the mid-1800s to describe the many foot worn trails that developed between towns and villages by walkers and horses.

The bridle track referred to here is unusual in that it is still known as the 'Bridle Track' largely because it has remained relatively unimproved and much on its original alignment for more than a century. Most other tracks have either been abandoned and overgrown or alternatively have become roads with distinct names.

The Bridle Track is, at this time, a portion of the road that links the city of Bathurst with the village of Hill End, via . The track is the northern portion of this route, the remainder being conventional roads, both sealed and gravel on the southern, Bathurst end. The section known as the Bridle Track commences at the Winburndale Creek crossing and extends into the village of Hill End.

History

From the early days of Hill End it appears that a narrow trail, only suitable for pedestrians and riders on horseback, wove a very windy and hilly trail along the steep cuttings and over the hills beside the Macquarie and Turon Rivers to the major town of Bathurst. This trail along the Macquarie and Turon Rivers was quite likely first used in the 1850-60's when Gold was first discovered in the Hill End locality. A newspaper reporters reference to a Bridle Track approaching Hill End from the south was written in 1865. In 1871 it was recognized as a much shorter and quicker route to Hill End but the last six miles were impassable by other than by horse back riders.

In the early 1870s an accommodation house known as Foot's was located about 18 miles from Bathurst, about half way along the journey and at the start of the Bridle Track section. In 1872 the first of the improvements were made to the narrow track at Hawkins Hill, where the steep climb of the hill was replaced with a winding carriage track climbing around the hill. Miners had set up tents along the Rivers adjacent to the road and many Chinese with their vegetable plots could be seen along the track. At the foot of Hawkins Hill was the locality of Lower Turon and here an Inn known as Braggs Inn was located. Nine miles south of Hill End was a mining locality on the Bridle Track called the Root Hog.

In 1874 a buggy pulled by a single horse completed the journey along the Bridle Track after some improvement work on the track was carried out by a resident of Bathurst. This buggy ride was considerably faster than the official route to Bathurst and started the talk of creating a permanent roadway of the narrow track.

In 1876 various business and residents commenced lobbying in earnest to develop the narrow pony track, at that stage only suitable for horses, into a carriageway to allow horse-drawn carriages to travel the route. Work commenced in 1878 on the widening of the track into a horse-drawn carriage roadway.

In 1878 it was proposed by a Hill End committee to sacrifice the pony mail run from Bathurst to Hill End via the Bridle Track in lieu of keeping a six-day a week mail coach via Peel and Sofala. This was in response to the Postmaster General deciding to reduce the coach mail to three days per week. It appears that the Bridle Track pony mail was discontinued as in 1878 a petition was started to recommence a mail run from Bathurst to Hill End via the Bridle Track.

The following contemporary account from 1876, details the process for determining options for upgrading the track for horse-drawn vehicles:

The route is through rugged and remote countryside and has often been closed by washaways and rockfalls. In 1909 the road was closed and again in 1912. The Turon Shire Council carried out repair work on the road and during 1914 it was again passable by horse-drawn vehicles, such as a Trap carriage. Again in 1917 the road closed due to washaways and remained closed for 12 months.

A newspaper report in 1933 indicates that the road had not been used by motor vehicles to this date and it is not known how long after did a motor vehicle traverse the Bridle Track.

Between 1937 and 1940 the road was upgraded by the Turon Shire Council with funds provided by the NSW Government. In 1937 approximately 70 unemployed men, were engaged on the work as an unemployment relief project. The work was intended to provide a scenic tourist route along the river. The workforce expanded to about 250 men in 1939.

Present day
In 2010 the road was closed as a through road due to a landslide at Monaghans Bluff. A local committee is attempting to persuade the authorities to repair the road to allow through traffic and to bring more tourists to the area.

Work finally commenced to build a detour around Monaghans Bluff in February 2021, after the acquisition of several properties to allow a detour to be built.  It is anticipated that this work will take around 12 months, before the full length of the road is re-opened to traffic again.

On 13 February 2023 the Bridle Track was reopened, with a diversion track passing above Monaghans Bluff.  This came after many years of lobbying by local residents and the 4WD NSW-ACT Association, and with funding from NSW State Government and Bathurst City Council.

See also 

 List of roads in New South Wales
 List of historical roads of New South Wales

References

External References

 

Historical roads of New South Wales
Bathurst, New South Wales
Central West (New South Wales)